Khambhalia railway station is a railway station on the Western Railway network in the state of Gujarat, India. Khambhalia railway station is 54 km far away from Jamnagar railway station. Passenger, MEMU, Express and Superfast trains halt at Khambhalia railway station.

Nearby Stations 

Viramdad is nearest railway station towards , whereas Sinhan is nearest railway station towards .

Major trains

Following Express/Superfast trains halt at Khambhalia railway station in both direction:

 15635/36 Dwarka Express
 15045/46 Gorakhpur–Okha Express
 19567/68 Okha–Tuticorin Vivek Express
 16337/38 Ernakulam–Okha Express
 19251/52 Somnath–Okha Express
 22969/70 Okha–Varanasi Superfast Express
 22905/06 Okha–Howrah Link Express
 16733/34 Rameswaram–Okha Express
 19575/76 Okha–Nathdwara Express
 18401/02 Puri–Okha Dwarka Express
 19565/66 Uttaranchal Express
 19573/74 Okha–Jaipur Weekly Express
 22945/46 Saurashtra Mail

See also
 Devbhumi Dwarka district

References

Railway stations in Devbhoomi Dwarka district
Rajkot railway division